Francis Goodwin (1784–1835) was an English architect, born in King's Lynn, Norfolk.  He trained under J. Coxedge in Kensington, London.  He initially designed two churches in King's Lynn, followed by nine Commissioners' churches.  He then designed more new churches, and rebuilt or remodelled other churches, for different clients, and also gained commissions for civic and public buildings.  Most of his church designs were in Gothic Revival style, while those for civic and public buildings were mainly Neoclassical.  Later in his career he became involved in domestic architecture.  He also unsuccessfully created many designs for other buildings, such as King's College, Cambridge, and the new Houses of Parliament.  He died suddenly in London, and was buried in Kensal Green Cemetery.

Key

Works

References

Bibliography

External links 

 Photograph of Church of Saint John the Evangelist, Derby, UK, before the removal of the unstable cupolas prior to 1900, from "picturethepast.org.uk"
  Photograph and text, Wolverhampton History and Heritage Society page on Saint Mary's, Bilston
  Photograph and text, Wolverhampton History and Heritage Society page on Saint Leonard's, Bilston
  Photograph of Saint George's Church, Kidderminster at Flickr
  Photograph of Lissadell House, County Sligo, Ireland, at Flickr 
 Photograph of Church of Saint Peter, Ashton under Lyne
 Photograph of Church of Saint Matthew, Church Hill, Walsall, West Midlands at Geograph
 Portrait said to be that of Francis Goodwin, by Aglio, in the collection of the RIBA library 

Architecture in England
Church architecture
Lists of buildings and structures by architect
Gothic Revival architecture